The commutation cell is the basic structure in power electronics. It is composed of two electronic switches (today, a high-power semiconductor, not a mechanical switch). It was traditionally referred to as a chopper, but since switching power supplies became a major form of power conversion, this new term has become more popular.

The purpose of the commutation cell is to "chop" DC power into square wave alternating current. This is done so that an inductor and a capacitor can be used in an LC circuit to change the voltage. This is, in theory, a lossless process; in practice, efficiencies above 80-90% are routinely achieved. The output is usually run through a filter to produce clean DC power. By controlling the on and off times (the duty cycle) of the switch in the commutation cell, the output voltage can be regulated.

This basic principle is the core of most modern power supplies, from tiny DC-DC converters in portable devices to massive switching stations for high voltage DC power transmission.

Connection of two power elements

A Commutation cell connects two power elements, often referred to as sources, although they can either produce or absorb power.

Some requirements to connect power sources exist. The impossible configurations are listed in figure 1. They are basically:
 a voltage source cannot be shorted, as the short circuit would impose a zero voltage which would contradict the voltage generated by the source;
 in an identical way, a current source cannot be placed in an open circuit;
 two (or more) voltage sources cannot be connected in parallel, as each of them would try to impose the voltage on the circuit;
 two (or more) current sources cannot be connected in series, as each of them would try to impose the current in the loop.

This applies to classical sources (battery, generator) and capacitors and inductors: At a small time scale, a capacitor is identical to a voltage source and an inductor to a current source. Connecting two capacitors with different voltage levels in parallel corresponds to connecting two voltage sources, one of the forbidden connections in figure 1.

The figure 2 illustrates the poor efficiency of such a connection. One capacitor is charged to a voltage V, and is connected to a capacitor with the same capacity, but discharged.

The energy in the circuit is then . Therefore, half of the energy has been dissipated during the connection.

The same applies with the connections in series of two inductances. The magnetic flux remains constant before and after the commutation. As the total inductance after the commutation is 2L, the current becomes  (see figure 2). Here again, half of the energy is dissipated during the commutation.

As a result, it can be seen that a commutation cell can only connect a voltage source to a current source (and vice versa). However, using inductors and capacitors, it is possible to transform the behaviour of a source: for example, two voltage sources can be connected through a converter if it uses an inductor to transfer energy.

The structure of a commutation cell

As mentioned above, a commutation cell must be placed between a voltage and current sources. Depending on the state of the cell, both sources are either connected, or isolated. When isolated, the current source must be shorted, as it is impossible for a current to be created in an open circuit. The basic schematic of a commutation cell is therefore given in figure 3 (top). It uses two switches with opposite states: In the configuration depicted in figure 3, both sources are isolated, and the current source is shorted. Both sources are connected when the top switch is on (and the bottom switch is off).

It is impossible to have a perfect synchronization between the switches. At one point during the commutation, they would be either on (thus shorting the voltage source) or off (thus leaving the current source in an open circuit). This is why one of the switches has to be replaced by a diode. A diode is a natural commutation device, i.e., its state is controlled by the circuit itself. It will turn on or off at the exact moment it has to. The consequence of using a diode in a commutation cell is that it makes it unidirectional (see figure 3). A bidirectional cell can be built, but it is equivalent to two unidirectional cells connected in parallel.

The commutation cell in converters

The commutation cell can be found in any power electronic converter. Some examples are given in figure 4. As can be seen, a "current source" (actually a loop that contains an inductance) is always connected between the middle point and one of the external connections of the commutation cell, while a voltage source (or a capacitor, or a connection in series of voltage source and capacitor) is always connected to the two external connections.

See also
 Power electronics
 DC-DC
 Switched-mode power supply
 Buck converter
 Boost converter
 Buck-boost converter
 Cuk converter

References

External links
The Four Boostbuck Topologies

Power electronics
Electric power conversion